Koper is the fifth largest city in Slovenia. Located in the Istrian region in the southwestern part of the country, approximately five kilometres south of the border with Italy and 20 kilometres from Trieste, Koper is the largest coastal city in the country. It is bordered by the satellite towns of Izola and Ankaran. With a unique ecology and biodiversity, it is considered an important natural resource. The city's Port of Koper is Slovenia's only container port and a major contributor to the economy of the Municipality of Koper. The influence of the Port of Koper on tourism was one of the factors in Ankaran deciding to leave the municipality in a referendum in 2011 to establish its own municipality. The city is a destination for a number of Mediterranean cruising lines. Koper is the main urban centre of the Slovenian Istria, with a population of about 25,000. Aleš Bržan is the current mayor, serving since 2018.

The city of Koper is officially bilingual, with both Slovene and Italian as its official languages. Sights in Koper include the 15th-century Praetorian Palace and Loggia in Venetian Gothic style, the 12th-century Carmine Rotunda church, and St. Nazarius' Cathedral, with its 14th-century tower.

Koper is also one of the main road entry points into Slovenia from Italy, which lies to the north of the municipality. The main motorway crossing is at Spodnje Škofije to the north of the city of Koper. The motorway continues into Rabuiese and Trieste. Koper also has a rail connection with the capital city, Ljubljana. On the coast, there is a crossing at Lazaret into Lazzaretto in Muggia municipality in Trieste province. The Italian border crossing is known as San Bartolomeo.

Names
The Italian name of the city was anciently written as Capo d'Istria, and is reported on maps and sources in other European languages as such. Ancient names of the city include Ægidia and Justinopolis. The Slavic-speaking Slovene population calls the city "Koper." The Slavic-speaking population, present in the area since at least the late 7th century, largely relied on oral tradition up to the invention of printing. The Slovenian name Koper was first attested in writing in 1557, but with the spelling Copper.

History
 

Koper began as a settlement built on an island in the southeastern part of the Gulf of Koper in the northern Adriatic. Called Insula Caprea (Goat Island) or Capro by Roman settlers, it developed into the city of Aegida, which was mentioned by the Roman author Pliny the Elder in his Naturalis Historia (Natural History) (iii. 19. s. 23).

In 568, Roman citizens of nearby Tergeste (modern Trieste) fled to Aegida due to an invasion of the Lombards. In honour of the Byzantine Emperor Justinian II, the town was renamed Justinopolis. Later, Justinopolis was under both Lombard and Frankish rule and was briefly occupied by Avars in the 8th century.

Since at least the 8th century (and possibly as early as the 6th century) Koper was the seat of a diocese. One of Koper's bishops was the Lutheran reformer Pier Paolo Vergerio. In 1828, it was merged into the Diocese of Trieste.

Trade between Koper and Venice has been recorded since 932. In the war between Venice and the Holy Roman Empire, Koper was on the latter side, and as a result was awarded with town rights, granted in 1035 by Emperor Conrad II. After 1232, Koper was under the Patriarch of Aquileia, and in 1278 it joined the Republic of Venice. It was at this time that the city walls and towers were partly demolished.

In 1420, the Patriarch of Aquileia ceded his remaining possessions in Istria to the Republic, consolidating Venetian power in Koper.

Koper grew to become the capital of Venetian Istria and was renamed Caput Histriae 'head of Istria' (from which stems its modern Italian name, Capodistria).

The 16th century saw the population of Koper fall drastically, from its high of between 10,000 and 12,000 inhabitants, due to repeated plague epidemics. When Trieste became a free port in 1719, Koper lost its monopoly on trade, and its importance diminished further.

According to the 1900 census, 7,205 Italian, 391 Slovenian, 167 Croatian, and 67 German inhabitants lived in Koper.

Assigned to Italy from Austria-Hungary after World War I, at the end of World War II it was part of the Zone B of the Free Territory of Trieste, controlled by Yugoslavia. Most of the Italian inhabitants left the city by 1954, when the Free Territory of Trieste formally ceased to exist and Zone B became part of Socialist Federal Republic of Yugoslavia. In 1977, the Roman Catholic Diocese of Koper was separated from the Diocese of Trieste.

With Slovenian independence in 1991, Koper became the only commercial port in Slovenia. The University of Primorska is based in the city.

Architecture

Koper's 15th-century Praetorian Palace is located on the city square. It was built from two older 13th-century houses that were connected by a loggia, rebuilt many times, and then finished as a Venetian Gothic palace. Today, it is home to the city of Koper's tourist office.

The city's Cathedral of the Assumption was built in the second half of the 12th century and has one of the oldest bells in Slovenia (from 1333), cast by Nicolò and Martino, the sons of Master Giacomo of Venice. The upper terrace is periodically open and offers a great view of the Bay of Trieste. In the middle of it hangs the Sacra Conversatione painting from 1516, one of the best Renaissance paintings in Slovenia, made by Vittore Carpaccio.

Climate 
Koper has a humid subtropical climate (Cfa). This climate is considered to be Cfa according to the Köppen-Geiger climate classification.

Demographics 

Italian was once the main language in the town, spoken by 92% of the population in 1900, but this number decreased sharply after Slovenian Istria was incorporated into Yugoslavia in 1954 and many ethnic Italians left the town. Today, Italian is mainly used as a second language by the Slovene-speaking majority. Slovene dominates with virtually all citizens speaking it, followed by pockets of speakers of Italian and Croatian.

Sports 
The main association football club is FC Koper, who currently play in the Slovenian PrvaLiga - having won it once during its existence.

Port 

First established during the Roman Empire, the Port of Koper has played an important role in the development of the area. It is among the largest in the region and is one of the most important transit routes for goods heading from Asia to central Europe. In contrast with other European ports, which are managed by port authorities, the activities of the Port of Koper comprise the management of the free zone area, the management of the port area, and the role of terminal operator.

Prominent citizens 

 Gian Rinaldo Carli (1720–1795), man of letters
 Vittore Carpaccio (c. 1460 – c. 1525), painter. Born in Venice, lived in Koper (then Capodistria)
 Boris Cavazza (born 1939), actor
 Aldo Cherini (born 1919), historian and writer
 Giorgio Cobolli, Italian gold medal in the Second World War
 Vlatko Čančar (born 1997), professional basketball player
 Lucija Čok (born 1941), linguist, politician
 Zlatko Dedić (born 1984), football player
 Domenico da Capodistria (born late 14th century), architect
 Lorella Flego (born 1974), TV entertainer
 Rudolf Golouh (1887–1982), politician and author
 Jaka Ivančič (born 1979), photographer
 Enej Jelenič (born 1992), footballer
 Ioannis Kapodistrias (1776–1831), Greek patriot and first governor of the Greek state (1828–1831) his family hailed originally from Koper/Capodistria
 Andreja Klepač (born 1986), professional tennis player
 Tinkara Kovač (born 1978), singer
 Bruno Maier (1922–2001), writer and literary critic
 Matjaž Markič (born 1983), swimmer
 Dragan Marušič, former rector of the University of Primorska
 Davor Mizerit (born 1981), rower
 Igor Pribac (born 1958), philosopher
 Pier Antonio Quarantotti Gambini (1910–1965), journalist and writer. Born in Pazin (then Pisino), lived in Koper (then Capodistria)
 Mladen Rudonja (born 1971), football player
 Tomaž Šalamun (1941–2014), poet
 Santorio Santorio (1561–1636), medical scientist
 Nazario Sauro (1880–1916), Italian irredentist and sailor
 Spartaco Schergat (1920–1996), military frogman, caused damage to the British battleship Queen Elizabeth in 1941. Italian gold medal in the Second World War
 Damir Skomina (born 1976), football referee
 Francesco Trevisani (1656–1746), painter
 Pier Paolo Vergerio the Elder (1370–1444/1445), humanist, statesman and canonist
 Pier Paolo Vergerio the Young (1498–1565), man of Church
 Gašper Vinčec (born 1981), professional Finn Class Sailor
 Captain Antonio Zetto, traveller, Globe Trotting: A Ten Years' Walk 1922–1932
 Bruno Zago, footballer (born 1919)
 Vittorio Italico Zupelli (1859–1945), general, minister

International relations

Twin towns and cities
Koper is twinned with:

References

External links

 Koper on Geopedia
 
 Koper–Capodistria. Slovenian Tourist Board.
 Koper: Virtual Tour. Panoramas of Koper and surrounding area. Burger.si.

 
Port cities and towns of the Adriatic Sea
Populated places in the City Municipality of Koper
Slovenian Riviera
Port cities and towns in Slovenia
Populated coastal places in Slovenia
Cities and towns in the Slovene Littoral